The Far Country is the sixth album by the American singer-songwriter Andrew Peterson, released in 2005. The title is from a quote by Meister Eckhart, a 16th-century German spiritual teacher that says, "God is at home. We are in the far country."

Background
Peterson worked with Ben Shive, in the production of this album. Fervent Records released the album on August 30, 2005.

Critical reception

Awarding the album four and a half stars at AllMusic, Jared Johnson states, "The Far Country saw Andrew Peterson going to great lengths to create a thought-provoking acoustic concept album, a sparkling feat indeed considering how dry the CCM-folk well had run by 2005." David Mackle, rating the album an A for CCM Magazine, writes, "The Far Country, exudes a pride swallowing intimacy that begs you to bend your ear its way and then pushes you
toward hope...Peterson is writing his own legacy, and you need to hear it." Giving the album four and a half stars from Christianity Today, Russ Breimeier says, "Peterson excels with relatable lyrics grounded in both Scripture and everyday life, thus communicating timeless truths, rather than merely reciting them." Jennifer E. Jones, indicating in a four spins review by Christian Broadcasting Network, replies, "His signature sound of quiet folk has barely changed a note, which works for Peterson because it allows his stellar lyric-writing skills to shine." Signaling in a four and a half star review at Jesus Freak Hideout, Laura Nunnery describes, "Peterson's songs may have a folk sound, but they are anything but boring." Michael Dalton, rating the album a four and a half from The Phantom Tollbooth, responds, "Andrew Peterson directs us toward home in a way that makes it a little easier to live in the far country...This is a look to heaven that alternates between hope, yearning and joy." Giving the album a seven out of ten for Cross Rhythms, Mike Rimmer recognizes, "Elsewhere the acoustic sounds, poppy melodies and sensitive arrangements make this a winner if not a little derivative of Mullins' oeuvre."

Track listing

References

2005 albums
Andrew Peterson (musician) albums
Fervent Records albums